Zhou Lumin (born 1956 in Haining) is a Chinese former volleyball player who played the setter position. She was part of the Chinese team that won gold at the 1981 FIVB Women's World Cup. After retirement, she coached the Shanghai Women's Volleyball Team until 1998, for a total of twelve years.

References

1956 births
Volleyball players from Zhejiang
People from Haining
Sportspeople from Jiaxing
Living people
Chinese women's volleyball players
Chinese volleyball coaches
20th-century Chinese women